Sandra Hastenteufel (born 1966 in Stuttgart) is a contemporary German artist who works with photography, film, sculpture and painting.

Life
She studied at the State Academy of Fine Arts Stuttgart.

In 1996 she participated in a group exhibition of video art. In 2005 she was awarded the Rome Prize by the German Academy Villa Massimo, Rome. For the spring semester of 2006 she was appointed the director of the interdisciplinary Cornell in Rome Art Program.

Work
Her plant portraits are original size cibachromes of sprouts in the woods. She also creates interdisciplinary projects involving ballet, classical music and opera. Her project Face to Face (Staatsoper Stuttgart /Württembergischer Kunstverein), brings together Monteverdi's opera L'incoronazione di Poppea and the work of the painter Caravaggio. She has photographed Vladimir Malakhov, Daniel Barenboim, and the King and Queen of Thailand.

Her work is held in the Daimler Collection.

References

Living people
1966 births
Artists from Stuttgart
Photographers from Baden-Württemberg
German women photographers
Postmodern artists
20th-century German painters
21st-century German painters
20th-century German women artists
21st-century German women artists
20th-century women photographers
21st-century women photographers